The 1932 United States presidential election in Oregon took place on November 8, 1932, as part of the 1932 United States presidential election. Voters chose five representatives, or electors, to the Electoral College, who voted for president and vice president.

Background and results
Oregon was essentially a one-party Republican state during the Fourth Party System from 1896 to 1928, with the party winning almost every statewide election during the period. Apart from Woodrow Wilson’s two elections, during the first of which the GOP was severely divided, no Democrat had carried a single county in the state since William Jennings Bryan in 1900.

However, since the 1928 election when Oregon had been won against Al Smith by 30.04%, the United States had fallen into the Great Depression, which had been particularly severe in the rural western parts of the nation. The New Deal was especially popular in the Pacific States, and as a result Roosevelt was assured of carrying the state.

Oregon was won by Governor Franklin D. Roosevelt (D–New York), running with Speaker John Nance Garner, with 57.99% of the popular vote, against incumbent President Herbert Hoover (R–California), running with Vice President Charles Curtis, with 36.88% of the popular vote. Roosevelt flipped every county in Oregon except arch-Yankee Benton. This election marked the first-ever Democratic victory in the northern coastal counties of Clatsop, Tillamook, and Lincoln as well as the first Democratic victory in the Willamette Valley-based county of Washington, the inland wheat-growing county of Wheeler, and the Central Oregon county of Deschutes.  It was also just the second Democratic victory in the historically Republican counties of Clackamas, Gilliam, Marion, Multnomah, Sherman and Yamhill.

Results

Results by county

See also
 United States presidential elections in Oregon

References

1932 Oregon elections
Oregon
1932